Jules-Martin Cambon (5 April 1845 – 19 September 1935) was a French diplomat and brother to Paul Cambon.  As the ambassador to Germany (1907–1914) he worked hard to secure a friendly détente. He was frustrated by French leaders such as Raymond Poincaré, who decided Berlin was trying to weaken the Triple Entente of France, Russia and Britain,  and was not sincere in seeking peace.  The French consensus was that war was inevitable.

Biography

Cambon began his career as a lawyer in (1866), served in the Franco-Prussian War and entered the civil service in 1871. He was prefect of the départment of Nord (1882) and of the Rhône (1887–1891), and in 1891 became governor-general of Algeria, where he had served in a minor position in 1874.

Cambon was nominated French ambassador at Washington D.C. in 1897, and in that capacity negotiated the preliminaries of peace on behalf of the  Spanish government after the war with the United States. He was serving as the French ambassador to the United States during the War of 1898.  He was an active participant in the peace negotiations between Spain and the United States and a contributor to the final agreement, the Treaty of Paris of 1898. His role in those negotiations helped Spain and France to develop a strong political partnership.

Cambon was transferred in 1902 as ambassador to Spain, and in 1907 to Germany Berlin,  where he served until the outbreak of World War I in 1914, and then as the head of the political section of the French foreign ministry during the war. Cambon believed in the Entente Cordiale with Britain, and worked to reinforce and strengthen diplomatic ties with France's main ally. Secret negotiations led to the settlement of Palestine, after the allies defeat of Ottoman Turkey. Cambon acted as adviser to French Prime Minister, Alexandre Ribot as war draw to a close. Secrecy surrounded the issue of a Sykes–Picot Agreement, known for many months only to Paris and London. Cambon assisted in the Triple Entente of Arab–Zionism–Armenian alliance after the fall of the Sultanate had given way to the military regime of the Young Turks. His department shared military and other intelligence with the British Foreign Office in pursuit of the defeat of the Central Powers, Tsarism and Bolshevism.

In 1928 he published what became a classic study of diplomacy, Le Diplomate, which was translated into English, Spanish, German, and Russian. In it he wrote: "What really distinguishes the diplomatist from the common herd is his apparent indifference to emotions; he is compelled to carry professional reserve to lengths which seem incomprehensible."

His brother, Paul, was also a notable French diplomat.

See also
 French entry into World War I

References

Further reading
 Keiger, John (1983). "Jules Cambon and Franco-German Détente, 1907–1914". The Historical Journal. 26 (3): 641–659. doi:10.1017/S0018246X00021099. online
 Jules Cambon, The Diplomatist, trans. Christopher R. Turner. London: Philip Allan, 1931.

External links

 Cambon, Jules. France and the United States: Essays and Addresses (1903)  online
 Library of Congress
 
 
 
 

1845 births
1935 deaths
Diplomats from Paris
Members of the Académie Française
Ambassadors of France to Spain
Ambassadors of France to Germany
Prefects of Constantine
Prefects of Nord (French department)
Prefects of Rhône (department)
19th-century French diplomats
20th-century French diplomats
Governors general of Algeria